Bob, Rob, or Robert Schroeder may refer to:

 Bob Schroeder (born 1960), American businessman and politician
 Rob Schroeder (1926–2011), American racing driver
 Robert W. Schroeder III (born 1966), American federal judge

See also
 Bob Schroder (born 1944), American baseball player